Brunneria brasiliensis is a species of praying mantis found in Brazil and Bolivia.

References

L
Mantodea of South America
Insects of Brazil
Invertebrates of Bolivia
Insects described in 1915